Esthlogena is a genus of longhorn beetles of the subfamily Lamiinae.

Species 
Esthlogena contains the following species:

subgenus Esthlogena
 Esthlogena albisetosa Bates, 1880
 Esthlogena albolineata (Breuning, 1940)
 Esthlogena amaliae Galileo & Martins, 2011
 Esthlogena brunnescens Breuning, 1940
 Esthlogena chicacaoensis Galileo & Martins, 2011
 Esthlogena comata (Thomson, 1857)
 Esthlogena crassa Martins, Galileo & Santos-Silva, 2015
 Esthlogena dissimilis Galileo & Martins, 2011
 Esthlogena foveolata Aurivillius, 1920
 Esthlogena glaucipennis Thomson, 1868
 Esthlogena guatemalena Bates, 1885
 Esthlogena lanata Breuning, 1940
 Esthlogena maculifrons Thomson, 1868
 Esthlogena mirandilla Bates, 1885
 Esthlogena nigrosuturalis Galileo & Martins, 2011
 Esthlogena porosa Bates, 1872
 Esthlogena porosoides Breuning, 1969
 Esthlogena setosa Galileo, Bezark & Santos-Silva, 2016
 Esthlogena spinipennis Breuning, 1942
 Esthlogena spinosa Breuning, 1954

subgenus Pseudotaxia
 Esthlogena bella Galileo, Martins, Le Tirant & Santos-Silva, 2014
 Esthlogena obliquata Breuning, 1940
 Esthlogena proletaria Thomson, 1868

References

Pteropliini